The discography of Zapp, an American funk band, consists of seven studio albums, twenty-two singles, and two official compilation albums.

Albums

Studio albums

Compilation albums

Singles

References

External links

Discographies of American artists
Rhythm and blues discographies
Funk music discographies